Tri (English: Three) is a 2002 album by Serbian pop singer Ana Stanić. It was released in June 2002.

The album contains 10 songs, and 4 remixes. The video for her first hit-single off the album titled "20, 30 godina" was filmed in Budapest, though, it was originally planned to be filmed in Thailand. It was released in spring 2002, and became one of her signature songs.

Track listing
 "Ako živiš za mene" – 4:04
 "Prijateljska" – 3:46
 "Stranac" – 4:03
 "Samba" – 4:09
 "Sat" – 3:55
 "Plima i oseka" – 3:09
 "Autoput" – 3:55
 "20, 30 godina" – 4:34
 "I kada si sam" – 3:33
 "Priča ova ulica" – 4:08
 "20, 30 godina (Guitar Mix)" – 3:44
 "Sat (Remix)" – 4:48
 "20, 30 godina (Remix)" – 4:14
 "Priča ova ulica (Remix)" – 3:17

External links 
 Official Website of Ana Stanić
 Label Report PGP-RTS
 On: www.discogs.com

2002 albums